Saad Khalloqi (born May 14, 1978) is a Moroccan former swimmer, who specialized in individual medley events. Khalloqi qualified only for the men's 200 m individual medley at the 2000 Summer Olympics in Sydney by receiving a Universality place from FINA, in an entry time of 2:11.70. He challenged seven other swimmers in heat one, including Kuwait's four-time Olympian Sultan Al-Otaibi. He held off a challenge from Al-Otaibi to grab a sixth seed by a full body length of three seconds, in a scintillating time of 2:13.22. Khalloqi failed to advance into the semifinals, as he placed fifty-fourth overall in the prelims.

References

1978 births
Living people
Moroccan male swimmers
Olympic swimmers of Morocco
Swimmers at the 2000 Summer Olympics
Male medley swimmers
20th-century Moroccan people
21st-century Moroccan people